TAM – Transporte Aéreo Militar (Military Air Transport) was an airline based in La Paz, Bolivia. It was owned by the Bolivian Air Force, and was established to offer flights to rural communities where commercial airlines could not operate profitably. It also operated in competition with commercial airlines on many of Bolivia's trunk domestic routes. In September 2019, the airline suspended all operations.

History

TAM began operations on June 15, 1945, with the acquisition of new Douglas C-47s. In 1955, the squadron of the Bolivian Air Transport decided for TAM to begin commercial operations.

"El Grupo Aéreo "71" (the Air group "71") known by the civil populace as Transporte Aéreo Militar (TAM), is an essential part of the structure of the Bolivian Air Force and the fundamental element for the development and integration of the populations in the distant parts of the national territory."

—TAM website, Historical summary/review.

The original name (from 1944) was "El Escuadrón de Transporte Aéreo" (ETA). In 1953 the name was changed to Transporte Aéreo Militar. This heritage is reflected in the words "Grupo Aéreo 71" appearing as part of the TAM logo.

The airline has stopped their flights since July 2018. On March 27, 2019, the airline gained authorization to begin flying again, but during that period failed to obtain an operating authorization from the ATT; this failure lead to them ceasing all operations again on September 23, 2019.

Destinations
Transporte Aéreo Militar serviced the following destinations:

Cobija – Captain Aníbal Arab Airport
Cochabamba – Jorge Wilstermann International Airport
Guayaramerín – Guayaramerín Airport
La Paz – El Alto International Airport
Riberalta – Riberalta Airport
Rurrenabaque – Rurrenabaque Airport
Santa Cruz de la Sierra:
El Trompillo Airport (SRZ) 
Sucre – Juana Azurduy de Padilla International Airport
Tarija – Capitán Oriel Lea Plaza Airport

Fleet

The TAM fleet consists of the following aircraft as of February 2014:

Accidents and incidents
On 11 September 1962 Captain Walter Arze Rojas's aircraft crashed after the plane was given standard gasoline instead of aviation fuel. 
On 12 February 1970, Douglas DC-3 TAM-11 crashed while attempting an emergency landing at Laja Airport. The aircraft was operating a non-scheduled passenger flight. All five people on board survived.
On 14 July 1970, Douglas DC-3 TAM-17 was damaged beyond repair in an accident at El Alto International Airport, La Paz.
On 4 May 1971, Douglas C-47 TAM-22 crashed shortly after take-off from El Alto Airport, La Paz on a cargo flight to El Jovi Airport.
On 25 September 1972, Douglas C-47A TAM-24 was reported to have been damaged beyond economic repair in an accident at Caranavi Airport.
On 19 January 1974, Douglas DC-3 TAM-30 was damaged beyond economic repair in a wheels-up landing at Laia.
On 11 November 1974, Douglas DC-3 TAM-34 crashed near the Sorata Mountain shortly after take-off from El Alto Airport.
On 27 October 1975, a CV-440 crashed into the Cerro Colorado volcano during takeoff, killing all 4 crew and 63 passengers on board. The aircraft was carrying military officers and their families.
On 18 March 2011, a Xian MA60 (with Bolivian registration FAB-96) with 33 passengers and crew aboard, performed an emergency landing without locked nose landing gear in the airport of the touristic Amazonian village of Rurrenabaque, on arrival from La Paz. No injuries were reported.
On 9 January 2012 a Xian MA60 (with Bolivian registration FAB-96) with 16 passengers and 5 crew aboard performed an emergency landing without landing gear lowered at Guayaramerin on arrival from Riberalta. No injuries occurred, but the aircraft was substantially damaged.

References

External links

www.tam.bo Página Oficial de Transporte Aéreo Militar. (In Spanish)
Fuerza Aérea Boliviana (The website of the FAB, the Bolivian Air Force).

Defunct airlines of Bolivia
Airlines established in 1945
Airlines disestablished in 2019
Military airlines
1945 establishments in Bolivia
2019 disestablishments in Bolivia
La Paz